Penthea mastersi is a species of beetle in the family Cerambycidae. It was described by Thomas Blackburn in 1897. It is known from Australia.

References

Pteropliini
Beetles described in 1897
Taxa named by Thomas Blackburn (entomologist)